Love Can't Wait is a 2006 South Korean television series starring Hong Kyung-min and Lee Young-ah. It aired on MBC from January 1 to July 2, 2006 on Mondays to Fridays at 20:20 for 198 episodes.

It tells the love story of an immature 19-year-old senior from a girls' high school and a penniless but intelligent 25-year-old college student studying law.

Synopsis
Cheerful and flighty high school senior Seo Eun-min (Lee Young-ah) meets Tae-kyeong (Hong Kyung-min), an independent and responsible law student, when she goes to the university library to run an errand for her sister. She instantly falls in love and lies to him that she's a scriptwriter. They start dating, and Tae-kyeong falls in love with the charming Eun-min. However, Eun-min's lie does not last long when they meet again as private tutor and student. Since Eun-min hates studying more than anything, Tae-kyeong tells her that she should do something else with her life if she does not want to go to college, and drags her to the Haja Center. Knowing that he has faith in her and wants what's best for her, Eun-min impulsively decides to marry him. Proud that Tae-kyeong is the first thing that's hers alone, at first Eun-min treats their marriage as an accomplishment in itself and their poor circumstances as a game: she does not mind that their  basement apartment is windowless, and has leaky ceilings and rats. But the hardships of poverty and newlywed life soon make her grow up fast.

Cast

Main cast
 Hong Kyung-min as Kim Tae-kyeong, college student
 Lee Young-ah as Seo Eun-min, high school senior
 Choi Jung-yoon as Seo Eun-joo, scriptwriter and Eun-min's older sister
 Choi Kyu-hwan as Hwang Young-min, scriptwriter

Supporting cast
 Baek Il-seob as Kim Cheol-hwan, Tae-kyeong's father
 Jung Hye-sun as Kang Soon-ja, Tae-kyeong's mother
 Yoon Hae-young as Kim Tae-hee, Tae-kyeong's sister
 Lee Doo-il as Kim Tae-soo, Tae-kyeong's older brother
 Kim Ji-young as Kang Hee-jung, Tae-soo's wife
 Jo Yoon-hee as Kang Hee-soo, Hee-jung's younger sister
 Park Won-sook as Kang Yeon-sook, Eun-min's mother
 Sunwoo Yong-nyeo as Kang In-sook, Eun-min's aunt
 Hyun Seok as Eun-min's father
 Lee Hyun-woo as Yoon Ki-hoon, divorced manhwa artist
 Lee Eun as Oh Young-shim, Eun-min's friend

References

External links
 Love Can't Wait official MBC website 
 Love Can't Wait at MBC Global Media

MBC TV television dramas
2006 South Korean television series debuts
2006 South Korean television series endings
South Korean romance television series
Television series by JS Pictures